Lyman Jewett (March 9, 1813 – January 7, 1897) was an American Baptist missionary known for translating the Bible into Telugu.

Background 
Born in Waterford, Maine, Jewett studied at Worcester Academy and Brown University before earning his Doctor of Divinity from the Newton Theological Institution. He sailed with his wife for India in October 1848 and reached Nellore in April 1849. The founder of the Telugu Mission in Ongole was Samuel S. Day. After Samuel S. Day, Jewett was the central figure of the Mission along with John E. Clough. The results of the mission were meagre and the home organisation repeatedly pressed for its closure. Jewett and his wife were home, sick, in America in 1862 when one such attempt was made to stop funding for the mission. He learned Telugu from a Brahmin convert.

Jewett died in Fitchburg, Massachusetts.

See also
Telugu Christian
Bible translations into Telugu

References

1813 births
1897 deaths
Baptist missionaries from the United States
Baptist missionaries in India
Translators of the Bible into Telugu
Christianity in Andhra Pradesh
19th-century translators
American expatriates in India
People from Waterford, Maine
Brown University alumni
19th-century Baptists
Missionary linguists